Betulin is an abundant, naturally occurring triterpene. It is commonly isolated from the bark of birch trees. It forms up to 30% of the dry weight of silver birch bark. It is also found in birch sap. Inonotus obliquus contains betulin.

The compound in the bark gives the tree its white color which appears to protect the tree from mid-winter overheating by the sun. As a result, birches are some of the northernmost occurring deciduous trees.

History
Betulin was discovered in 1788 by German-Russian chemist Johann Tobias Lowitz.

Chemistry
Chemically, betulin is a triterpenoid of lupane structure. It has a pentacyclic ring structure, and hydroxyl groups in positions C3 and C28.

See also 

 Abietic acid
 Stanol ester
 Phytosterols

References

Triterpenes
Isopropenyl compounds